Golzar-e Yagan (also Romanized as Golzār-e Yagan; also known as Golzār) is a village in Qorqori Rural District, Qorqori District, Hirmand County, Sistan and Baluchestan Province, Iran. At the 2006 census, its population was 156, in 28 families.

References 

Populated places in Hirmand County